Marie Šmídová (née Masáková), was a female Czech international table tennis player.

Table tennis career
She won fourteen World Table Tennis Championships medals, in the women's singles, doubles and team events and the mixed doubles. She won three gold medals; two in the team event and one in the women's doubles.

The fourteen World Championship medals included three gold medals; one in the doubles with Marie Kettnerová at the 1936 World Table Tennis Championships and two in the team event.

She also won two English Open titles.

See also
 List of table tennis players
 List of World Table Tennis Championships medalists

References 

Czechoslovak table tennis players
1907 births
Year of death missing
World Table Tennis Championships medalists